Javier Álvarez Salgado (born 18 December 1943) is a Spanish former long-distance runner, born in Vigo, who competed in the 1968 Summer Olympics and in the 1972 Summer Olympics.

References

1943 births
Living people
Sportspeople from Vigo
Spanish male long-distance runners
Olympic athletes of Spain
Athletes (track and field) at the 1968 Summer Olympics
Athletes (track and field) at the 1972 Summer Olympics
Mediterranean Games gold medalists for Spain
Mediterranean Games medalists in athletics
Athletes (track and field) at the 1971 Mediterranean Games
20th-century Spanish people
21st-century Spanish people